Platysticta maculata (blurry forestdamsel) is a species of damselfly in family Platystictidae. It is endemic to Sri Lanka.

There are 2 subspecies recognized.

Subspecies
 Platysticta maculata deccanensis
 Platysticta maculata maculata

References

 Query Result
 Animal diversity web
 Sri Lanka Endemics
 List of odonates of Sri Lanka

Damselflies of Sri Lanka
Insects described in 1860